The 2019–20 Moldovan Women Top League season in association football was the 20th since its establishment. The season began on 8 September 2019 and the last match were played on 8 December 2019. On 4 August 2020, the league was abandoned due to COVID-19 pandemic in Moldova. As a result, Agarista-ȘS Anenii Noi were declared champions.

Teams

Format
The schedule consists of two rounds, each team plays each other once home-and-away for a total of 12 matches per team.

League table

Results

References

External links
Women Top League - Moldova - Results, fixtures, tables - FMF 

Moldovan Women Top League 2019-20
Moldovan Women Top League seasons
Moldova